Vijai Kapoor is a former IAS officer and was Lieutenant Governor of Delhi from 20 April 1998 to 9 June 2004. Currently he is director at Gujarat State Fertilizers and Chemicals Limited.

References

Living people
Indian civil servants
Lieutenant Governors of Delhi
Year of birth missing (living people)